The 2015–16 Fort Wayne Mastodons men's basketball team represented Indiana University – Purdue University Fort Wayne during the 2015–16 NCAA Division I men's basketball season. The Mastodons, led by second year head coach Jon Coffman, played their home games at the Gates Sports Center, with five home games at the Allen County War Memorial Coliseum, and were members of The Summit League. They finished the season 24–10, 12–4 in Summit League play to finish in a tie for the regular season championship. They lost in the semifinals of the Summit League tournament to North Dakota State. As a regular season league champion who was also the #1 seed in their league tournament, they received an automatic bid to the National Invitation Tournament where they lost in the first round to San Diego State.

Previous season 
The Mastodons finished the 2014–15 season with a record of 16–15, 9–7 in conference. They lost to South Dakota State in the quarterfinals of the Summit League tournament. IPFW received a bid to the CIT where they lost in the first round to Evansville.

Roster

Schedule

|-
!colspan=9 style="background:#003882; color:#FFFFFF;"|  Exhibition

|-
!colspan=9 style="background:#003882; color:#FFFFFF;"|  Regular season

|-
!colspan=9 style="background:#003882; color:#FFFFFF;"| The Summit League tournament

|-
!colspan=9 style="background:#003882; color:#FFFFFF;"| NIT

References

Purdue Fort Wayne Mastodons men's basketball seasons
IPFW
IPFW
2015 in sports in Indiana
2016 in sports in Indiana